Nasr Javed is a Kashmiri senior operative of the militant group Jammat-ud-Dawa. He is on the list of "individuals banned from the UK for stirring-up hatred" for "engaging in unacceptable behaviour by seeking to foment, justify or glorify terrorist violence in furtherance of particular beliefs." He is quoted at declaring that he will continue to wage jihad in a speech in Islamabad; "the government of Pakistan might have abandoned jihad, but we have not. Our agenda is clear. We will continue to wage and propagate jihad until eternity."

References

1963 births
Living people
Lashkar-e-Taiba members
Pakistani Islamists
Pakistani people of Kashmiri descent